Henry Glaß (born 15 February 1953 in Rodewisch) is an East German former ski jumper who competed during the 1970s.

His best-known success was at the 1976 Winter Olympics in Innsbruck, where he won a bronze medal in the individual large hill Event. Glaß also won a silver in the individual normal hill at the 1978 FIS Nordic World Ski Championships in Lahti and a bronze at the 1977 Ski-Flying World Championships in Vikersund. He was trained by Harry Glaß to whom he is unrelated.

References

 
 

1953 births
Living people
People from Rodewisch
People from Bezirk Karl-Marx-Stadt
German male ski jumpers
Sportspeople from Saxony
Olympic bronze medalists for East Germany
Olympic ski jumpers of East Germany
Ski jumpers at the 1972 Winter Olympics
Ski jumpers at the 1976 Winter Olympics
Ski jumpers at the 1980 Winter Olympics
Olympic medalists in ski jumping
FIS Nordic World Ski Championships medalists in ski jumping
Medalists at the 1976 Winter Olympics